James Edwin Bolin, Sr. (August 26, 1914 – March 25, 2002) was an American jurist and politician who served as a judge of the Louisiana Second Circuit Court of Appeal. He was a Democratic member of the Louisiana House of Representatives from Minden, the seat of government of Webster Parish in northwestern Louisiana.

Legislator and soldier
Bolin was elected state representative when the one-term incumbent, Drayton Boucher of Springhill, ran successfully for the Louisiana State Senate. In the legislative runoff election, Bolin defeated former representative and Minden mayor J. Frank Colbert, 3,161 (57.3 percent) to 2,358 (42.7 percent).

Judicial career

In 1956, Bolin defeated State Representative E. D. Gleason of Webster Parish, 2,503 to 912, for a seat at the proposed state constitutional convention. Because voters statewide rejected the calling of the convention, the election was moot.

Honors

Bolin died in 2002 at the age of eighty-seven in an assisted living facility in Shreveport. He is honored through the naming of Bolin Hall at the Louisiana Army National Guard installation at Camp Minden, formerly part of the Louisiana Army Ammunition Plant.

References

1914 births
2002 deaths
Democratic Party members of the Louisiana House of Representatives
Louisiana state court judges
Circuit court judges in the United States
Louisiana lawyers
United States Army officers
United States Army personnel of World War II
Military personnel from Louisiana
Louisiana State University alumni
Minden High School (Minden, Louisiana) alumni
Politicians from Minden, Louisiana
People from Springhill, Louisiana
People from Webster Parish, Louisiana
People from Shreveport, Louisiana
20th-century American judges
20th-century American politicians
20th-century American lawyers